The Demographics of the Middle East describes populations of the Middle East, a region covering western and northern parts of the Asian and African continents respecively.

Overview 

Encyclopedia Britannica definition of Middle East
Encyclopedia Britannica stated in 2018 that "by the mid-20th century a common definition of the Middle East encompassed the states or territories of Turkey, Cyprus, Syria, Lebanon, Iraq, Iran, Israel, Palestine, Jordan, Egypt, Sudan, Libya, and the various states and territories of Arabia proper (Saudi Arabia, Kuwait, Yemen, Oman, Bahrain, Qatar, and the Trucial States, or Trucial Oman [now United Arab Emirates])."

Historical 
In the year 1600, the population of the Middle East stood at about 18.5 million. Within modern borders:Alexander V. Avakov, Two Thousand Years of Economic Statistics, Volume 1, pages 12 to 14.

 Anatolia - c. 6,500,000
 Iran - 4,472,000
 Yemen - 2,243,000
 Saudi Arabia - 1,809,000
 Syria - 1,175,000
 Iraq - 1,000,000
 Lebanon - 292,000
 Oman - 275,000
 Jordan - 191,000
 Israel/Palestine - 161,000
 Cyprus - 98,000
 Kuwait - 71,000
 Bahrain - 54,000
 United Arab Emirates - 35,000

In addition, the population of North Africa was 12 million, with the following breakdown within borders:

 Egypt - 5,000,000
 Algeria - 2,250,000
 Morocco - 2,250,000
 Tunisia - 2,000,000
 Libya - 500,000

See also
 Demographics of the Arab League
 Demographics of the Middle East and North Africa
 Ethnic groups in the Middle East
 Genetic history of the Middle East
 Largest metropolitan areas of the Middle East
 List of Middle Eastern countries by population

References

 
Middle East
Demography